Les Roches-l'Évêque is a commune in the Loir-et-Cher department in central France.

Located in the north-west of the department, the town is part of the small agricultural region "the Valley and Coteaux du Loir", bordered to the north by a steep hill and to the south by gently sloping hillsides. It is drained by the Fargot and by two small rivers. With an area of 0.93 square miles in 2017, the town is one of the two smallest towns in the department.

Land use is marked by the importance of agricultural and natural spaces which occupy almost all of the municipal territory. A natural area of interest is present in the town: a natural area of ecological, faunistic and floristic interest (ZNIEFF). In 2010, the technico-economic orientation of agriculture in the town is the cultivation of cereals and oilseeds. Like the department which has seen a quarter of its farms disappear in ten years, the number of farms has fallen sharply, from 7 in 1988, to 5 in 2000, then to 0 in 2010.

Its inhabitants are called Rupiepiscopians.

The architectural heritage of the town includes two buildings included in the inventory of historical monuments: the chapel of Saint-Gervais des Roches-l'Évêque, classified in 1943, and the church of Saint-Almire des Roches-l'Évêque, listed in 1971.

Location and neighboring towns 
The commune of Les Roches-l'Évêque is located in the north-west of the department of Loir-et-Cher, in the small agricultural region of the Vallée et Coteaux du Loir. As the crow flies, it is 38.7 km from Blois, the prefecture of the department, 13.4 km from Vendôme, sub-prefecture, and 3.2 km from Montoire-sur-le-Loir, administrative center of the canton of Montoire-sur-le-Loir on which the village has been dependent since 2015.

The nearest towns are: Villavard (2.2 km), Saint-Rimay (2.8 km), Montoire-sur-le-Loir (3.2 km), Lavardin (3.7 km), Lunay (4.3 km), Houssay (4.3 km), Fontaine-les-Coteaux (5.4 km), Thoré-la-Rochette (5.7 km) and Mazangé (6.8 km).

Landscapes and terrain 
The landscapes of the loops of the Loir present a certain complexity: while the upstream part of the valley presents a calm and a serenity, near Les Roches, the Loir twists in tight meanders, restricted by a terrain marked by steep hillsides. Tuffeau, which has replaced the soft clay of the Perche, marks the landscape, with its white, sandy or ochre colors appearing on the cliffs weathered by the river.

The altitude of the village location ranges from 66 meters to 134 meters.

Population

See also
Communes of the Loir-et-Cher department

References

Communes of Loir-et-Cher
Loir-et-Cher communes articles needing translation from French Wikipedia